Bakurianis Andeziti is a village in Borjomi Municipality in the Samtskhe–Javakheti region of Georgia. The village has a population of 352, as of 2014.

Bakurianis Andeziti was granted daba status in 1956 but was downgraded to a village in 2018.

References 

Populated places in Borjomi Municipality